Ruth Marie Hogan (born 1961) is a British novelist. Her books are published by Two Roads, an imprint of Hachette.

Life
Hogan was born in Bedford, and her mother worked in a bookshop. She studied English and drama at Goldsmiths College and worked in human resources in local government for 10 years before being injured in a car crash which left her unable to work full time. Cancer in 2012 led to her writing while sleepless through chemotherapy, and the result was her first published work, The Keeper of Lost Things.

Writing
The reviewer in Kirkus Reviews  described Hogan's first novel, The Keeper of Lost Things, as "whimsical" and said that "Readers looking for some undemanding, old-fashioned storytelling with a sprinkling of magic will find it here."  The Guardian's reviewer described her second novel, The Wisdom of Sally Red Shoes as "warm and wise", saying that "Her passages on loss are vivid and visceral", and, writing of her third novel Queenie Malone's Paradise Hotel , said "Hogan has a reputation for eccentric characters, hints of the supernatural and the power of unexpected friendships. Here, she combines all these with a moving exploration of the complex relationship between mothers and daughters." Publishers Weeklys reviewer called her fourth novel "engrossing" and said it had "[the] trappings of a modern fairy tale".

Hogan's books have been published in many foreign translations such as Le gardien des choses perdus (French, title an exact translation of The Keeper of Lost Things) and Vielleicht Tanzen Wir Morgen (German, "Perhaps we will dance tomorrow", translation of The Wisdom of Sally Red Shoes).

Hogan has a publishing company named Tilbury Bean Books, named after her pet dog (also known as "Tilly"), which died before her first book was published.

Awards and shortlisting
The Keeper of Lost Things was shortlisted in the "popular fiction" category for the 2017 Books Are My Bag Readers' Awards (won that year by Gail Honeyman's Eleanor Oliphant is Completely Fine). 

Queenie Malone's Paradise Hotel won the Fantasy Romantic Novel Award in the 2020 Romantic Novelists' Association Awards.

Selected publications
 
 
 
 
Published in United States as The Moon, the Stars, and Madame Burova

References

External links

Interview
Interview about Madame Burova

1961 births
Living people
Alumni of Goldsmiths, University of London
People from Bedford
English women novelists
21st-century English novelists